William Seton may refer to:
 William Seton (writer) (1835–1905), American author, novelist and popular science writer
 William Seton, 1st Lord Seton (died 1410), Scottish noble
 William Seton of Kylesmure (1562–1635), Scottish landowner and postmaster